A Mone Mha The is a 2017 Burmese romantic-drama television series. It aired on MRTV-4, from October 20 to December 11, 2017, on Mondays to Fridays at 19:15 for 37 episodes.

Cast

Main
 Kyaw Htet Zaw as Sai Nay Yaung
 Hsaung Wutyee May as  Nay Cho Thway
 Kaung Myat San as Koe
 May Akari Htoo as Nan Yati

Supporting
 Min Oo as U Banyar Koe
 May Kabyar as Daw Darli Tin San
 Min Khant Ko as Han Chan
 Thun Thitsar Zaw as Ami Zaw
 Khin Thaw Tar San as Pyo Madi
 Ko Ko Lin Maung as U Phone Nyan
 Min Thit as U Sai Min Shein
 Khin Than Nwet as Daw Nan Kyay Hmone
 War War Aung as Daw Si Si Zaw

References

Burmese television series
MRTV (TV network) original programming